Waimamaku  is a village and rural community, based along the banks of the Waimamaku River south of the Hokianga Harbour on the west coast of New Zealand's North Island. It is located in the Far North District and Northland Region on State Highway 12, south of Ōmāpere and north of Waipoua.

It includes the area of Waiotemarama, west of the main Waimamaku village.

The local marae, known as Te Whakamaharatanga Marae or Waimamaku Marae, is a meeting place of Te Roroa and the Ngāpuhi hapū of Ngāti Korokoro and Ngāti Te Pou. It includes the Whakamaharatanga meeting house.

Notable people
 

 Marama Russell (c.1875–1952), midwife and tribal leader

References

Far North District
Populated places in the Northland Region